Vasyl Omelianovych Makukh (Ukrainian: Васи́ль Омеля́нович Ма́кух; 14 November 1927, Lwów Voivodeship, Second Polish Republic – 6 November 1968, Kyiv, Ukrainian SSR, Soviet Union) was a Soviet veteran of World War II, political prisoner and Ukrainian activist, and member of the Ukrainian Insurgent Army. 
Having been conscripted into the Red Army, in November 1944 Makukh defected and joined the nationalist Ukrainian Insurgent Army. In February 1946 he was wounded and captured after a shootout with Soviet and Polish border guards at the Soviet-Polish border (today Poland–Ukraine border). On 15 February 1946, Makukh was taken to the district precinct of the KGB (soviet Ministry of Internal Affairs) in Velyki Mosty and later to Lviv Prison No. 4 (known as "Brygidki"). On 11 July 1946, the Military Tribunal of Lviv garrison sentenced him to 10 years of hard labour (katorga) with five years of detention ("civil rights restriction") plus the confiscation of all his property. Makukh served  his sentence in Dubravlag (Mordovia) and other GULAG camps in Siberia. On 18 July 1955, he was freed and exiled to a local settlement, where he met a woman who had also served 10 years imprisonment. In 1956, both managed to return to Ukraine, and being forbidden to return to their own region, they settled in Dnipropetrovsk (today Dnipro), where they married and Makukh worked as a schoolteacher.

On November 5, 1968, he committed suicide by self-immolation on Khreshchatyk, Kyiv's main street, in protest against the Soviet rule of Ukraine, against russification as well as the Soviet invasion in Czechoslovakia. Before his death, Makukh shouted 'Long live free Ukraine!' He died the next day. On 6 November 1968 the prosecutor's office of the Leninsky District of Kyiv city opened a criminal case against him because of the suicide, the outcome of which was never made known.

See also
 Oleksa Hirnyk
 Romas Kalanta
 Ryszard Siwiec
 Jan Palach
 Jan Zajíc
 Evžen Plocek

References 

1927 births
1968 suicides
People from Lviv Oblast
People from Lwów Voivodeship
Soviet military personnel of World War II from Ukraine
Soviet defectors
Ukrainian Insurgent Army
Self-immolations in protest of the Eastern Bloc
Soviet dissidents
Suicides in Ukraine
Suicides in the Soviet Union
Ukrainian dissidents
Anti-Russification activists